Thetis class may refer to one of the following ship classes:

 , a class of four vessels operated by the Royal Danish Navy from 1991 to present
 , a class of five anti-submarine ships operated by the German Navy from 1962 until the 1990s, then the Hellenic Navy from 1991 until 2010
 , a class of seventeen patrol boats operated by the United States Coast Guard

See also
 Thetis (disambiguation), for individual ships named Thetis